Ackeem Blake (born January 21, 2002) is a Jamaican sprinter. 

Blake came fourth in the 4 x 100 metres relay at the 2022 World Athletics Championships in Eugene, Oregon.

At the 2022 Music City Track Carnival in Nashville, Tennessee, Blake ran a personal best time of 9.92 in the 100 m. However, World Athletics deemed the time to be unofficial and therefore it was not ratified.

Competitions record

References

External links 
 Ackeem Blake World Athletics Profile

2002 births
Living people
Jamaican male sprinters
21st-century Jamaican people